The Young Warriors is a war film filmed in 1967 by Universal Pictures based on Richard Matheson's 1960 novel The Beardless Warriors that was the working title of the film.  The novel was inspired by Matheson's own experiences as an 18-year-old infantryman with the 87th Infantry Division in Germany in World War II. The film was directed by John Peyser.

It was filmed cheaply by Universal on their backlot using many of its contract players, with Matheson asked to do a rewrite of his screenplay in order to use the battle sequences from Universal's To Hell and Back. When Universal wished to "lighten" Matheson's screenplay, they had Jonathan Daly write a comedy relief scene of chasing a duck through a minefield. The film was released as a double feature with Rosalind Russell's Rosie!

Premise
Europe: 1944.  A group of replacements are assigned to Sgt Cooley's squad and sent into battle.  Initially frightened, Hacker grows to love killing but loses that feeling as well.  He is promoted to Corporal and later given his own squad as a Sergeant in the end.

Cast
 James Drury as Sergeant Horatio Cooley
 Steve Carlson as Hacker (Hackermeyer in the novel)
 Jonathan Daly as Guthrie
 Robert Pine as Foley
 Jeff Scott as Cpl. Lippincott 
 Michael Stanwood as Riley
 John Alladin as Harris
 Hank Jones as Fairchild 
 Tom Nolan as Tremont 
 Norman Fell as Sergeant Wadley
 Buck Young as Schumacher 
 Kent McCord (as Kent McWhirther) as Lieutenant

Production
Matheson recalled that following the release of his novel he had offers from Richard Zanuck (who dropped his plans to film it when his father Darryl F. Zanuck was making The Longest Day) and Fred Zinnemann.  Zinnemann told Matheson that he wanted to make the film but had several other projects at the time; Matheson refused to wait and turned him down.

References

External links
 
 

1966 films
Films based on military novels
Films based on American novels
Films based on works by Richard Matheson
Films with screenplays by Richard Matheson
Western Front of World War II films
American World War II films
1960s English-language films
Films directed by John Peyser